"Heart Is a Drum" is a song by American rock musician Beck. It was released on July 24, 2014, as the fourth and final single from his ninth official studio album, Morning Phase. The song peaked at number 18 on the Billboard Bubbling Under Hot 100 Singles chart. Beck performed the song at the 57th Annual Grammy Awards alongside Coldplay band member Chris Martin.

Music video
The video revolves around Beck being stuck in a rural backwoods limbo. While at a house in the middle of nowhere, he sees different versions of himself from the past and future. He also encounters the grim reaper, and a version of himself from the 1993 music video "Loser".

Track listing

Personnel
Beck – lead and backing vocals, piano, acoustic guitar
Joey Waronker – drums, percussion
Stanley Clarke – electric bass

Charts

References

2014 singles
2014 songs
Beck songs
Capitol Records singles
Songs written by Beck